Hardstyle is an electronic dance genre that emerged in the late 1990s, with origins in the Netherlands, Belgium and Italy. Hardstyle mixes influences from techno, new beat and hardcore.

Early hardstyle was typically written at 140 BPM (beats per minute), however modern hardstyle is faster, produced around 150 BPM. It consisted of overdriven and hard-sounding kick drums, often accompanied by an offbeat bass, known as a "reverse bass". As the genre grew, the production techniques and songwriting changed to be suited to a more commercial audience. Modern hardstyle can be recognized by its use of synthesizer melodies and distorted sounds, coupled with hardstyle's signature combination of percussion and bass. The genre is particularly known for its harmonic use of kickdrums. Due to the sustained nature of a hardstyle kick, producers are able to play basslines by using only the kick itself, which becomes a distinct bass tone through a series of distortion, equalization and layering (among other methods). This technique is known as "pitching" a kick.

The genre gained commercial acceptance in the 2010s, with hardstyle artists performing on the biggest stages in EDM worldwide.

Hardstyle influenced other styles of electronic dance music such as big room house, which began sharing similarities with hardstyle like structures, rhythms, and later, pitching kicks became popular in big room too. Hardstyle also played a large influence in frenchcore and happy hardcore music, which both became popular in the late 2010s with the hardstyle audience after producers started applying hardstyle production techniques and melodic styles to the genres.

History

Origins
The exact origin of hardstyle cannot be specifically defined, however it is clear the characteristic of hardstyle originates from hard trance (notably hard trance's 'reverse bass', and artists such as German Hard Trance DJ, Scot Project) with influence with other genres such as hardcore, this genre is what is now known as early hardstyle. As it progressed, the genre gathered characteristics from other electronic music genres and refined its own sound and identity. Over time, the BPM of hardstyle music increased, from a range of 135 to 150 to a range of 150 to 160. Some hardcore producers brought hardstyle elements back to the hardcore scene, which made modern hardstyle and hardcore very similar and often indistinguishable in some cases, only differing in BPM.

The first event credited as a hardstyle event was Qlubtempo, which took place in the year 2000 in Zaandam. Qlubtempo was the first event produced by Q-dance, a Dutch event company which would later go on to produce hardstyle festivals in other countries in Europe, Australia, North America, South America and Asia. In 2001, Q-dance produced the first edition of Qlimax. Q-dance trademarked the term "hardstyle" on the 4th of July, 2002, after both Qlimax and Qlubtempo proved to be successful. Since its inception, Q-dance has guided the evolution of hardstyle music with its events and is often involved with hardstyle artists on a creative level. In 2003, Q-dance hosted the first edition of Defqon.1.

The first few years of hardstyle were characterized by a tempo of around 140–150 BPM, a distorted kick drum sound, vocal samples, dissonant synth sounds known as "screetches" and the use of a "reverse bass", a hard kick distorted offbeat bass within the same beat. Around 2002, more hardstyle labels emerged. Fusion Records (with artists as DJ Zany and Donkey Rollers) and Scantraxx (founded by Dov Elkabas) were the two largest Dutch Hardstyle labels in that period. At this point in time, hardstyle artists were primarily from either the Netherlands or Italy.

Subgenres

Euphoric hardstyle
From roughly 2010 onwards, the move towards a more melodic emphasis from older hardstyle evolved into the subgenre "euphoric hardstyle", characterized by highly emotional melodies and heavy pitch-shifting of kicks.

Euphoric frenchcore 

Popularized by Sefa and Dr. Peacock in the late 2010s, euphoric frenchcore combines both hardstyle and frenchcore. Euphoric frenchcore uses hardstyle production techniques at faster tempos, ranging between 180 to 220 BPM. The genre caught on quickly after Sefa released his first album in 2018, and it became common for hardstyle artists to close their sets with euphoric frenchcore tracks. That same year, Headhunterz invited Sefa to play on his radioshow, HARD with STYLE. The following years saw multiple euphoric frenchcore performances on the mainstage of Defqon.1, as well as a euphoric frenchcore anthem for the festival in 2019.

Trapstyle 
The trapstyle is a sub-genre of the hardstyle scene linked to the trap which appeared in the mid-2010s. DJ Coone evokes the genre in his remix of "Techno" by Yellow Claw, Diplo and LNY TNZ.

Dubstyle
In early 2010, a new variation in hardstyle, named dubstyle was introduced. Dubstyle is the name given to the genre fusion of hardstyle and dubstep. Dubstyle tends to have reversed wobble basslines and takes the kick styling of hardstyle tracks, while combining them with the rhythm, groove and dubstep tempo and effects a fusion of elements of hardstyle with a dubstep rhythm, usually a 2-step or a breakstep rhythm. After its initial appearance, dubstyle did not evolve or progress beyond the mid-2010s.

Notable related events

 Defqon.1
 Mysteryland
 Qlimax
 Reverze
 Sensation Black
 The Qontinent
 Decibel_Outdoor_Festival
 Intents_Festival
 Rebirth_Festival
 Knockout_Outdoor_Festival
 Basscon_Wasteland
 Electric_Daisy_Carnival
 Tomorrowland
 InfeXious

Notable labels

 Dirty Workz
 Fusion Records
 Q-dance
 Scantraxx

References

 
21st-century music genres
Electronic dance music genres
2010s in music
2020s in music